The Maserati Barchetta is a mid-engine racing car, like the 350 and 450S, that was designed by Carlo Gaino of the Synthesis Design, an Italian design house.

The Barchetta was designed and developed for the one-make racing series Grantrofeo Barchetta which was held 1992 and 1993 throughout Italy and Europe. It featured sixteen races in total, most of them in Italy. The Barchetta had a backbone chassis made of aluminium which was unusual for a Maserati automobile for a time considering that the cars offered by Maserati had a steel unibody construction. The Barchetta was one of the last Maserati models built under De Tomaso ownership.

16 examples of the racing model were produced by hand at the De Tomaso factory in Modena, plus two prototypes (one racing-corsa, one street-stradale model). It featured a mid-mounted Maserati AM501 V6 engine displacing 1,996 cc and was shared with the local 2.0 L engine offered in the Italian market on the Biturbo and the Ghibli. The engine was mated to a 6-speed manual transmission manufactured by ZF Friedrichshafen and having straight cut gears. Having a true open top design, driver protection was only provided by a small air deflector.

The central-frame concept was carried over in the De Tomaso Guarà, but the frame was around  longer because it was fitted with a larger V8 engine.

This was thought as a way to inject much needed excitement and enthusiasm for Maserati that saw its reputation badly ruined by years of exciting but maintenance sensitive products, eventually culminating in Maserati's withdrawal from the North American market at this time.

References

External links
 Official Maserati Barchetta page 
Synthesis Design/ Carlo Gaino designer of Maserati Barchetta
 Maserati Barchetta report QV500
  AM 501 Engine
 Maserati Barchetta
 Maserati Barchetta Stradale - Road version
 The Maserati Grantrofeo Barchetta Register at www.maserati-alfieri.co.uk

Barchetta
Sports racing cars
Automobiles with backbone chassis